Footscray may refer to:

Victoria, Australia 

 Footscray, Victoria, a suburb of Melbourne
 Footscray railway station
 Footscray Town Hall
 Footscray Football Club, the legal name of an Australian rules football club currently branded as Western Bulldogs
 Footscray Bulldogs, the reserve side of Western Bulldogs
 Footscray JUST, a defunct soccer club
 Footscray Institute of Technology, a precursor to Victoria University
 Footscray Park, a large Edwardian park

London, England 

 Foots Cray, an area of the London Borough of Bexley
 Footscray RUFC, a rugby union club in New Eltham